Willson v. Black-Bird Creek Marsh Co., 27 U.S. (2 Pet.) 245 (1829), was a significant United States Supreme Court case regarding the definition of the Commerce Clause in Article 1 sec. 8, cl. 3 of the U.S. Constitution.

Background 
Willson, the owner of a sloop who was licensed under federal navigation laws, the Sally, broke through a dam that blocked his passage which was built by the Black-Bird Creek Marsh Co. and had been authorized to do so by Delaware law. The company brought a case against Willson, claiming Delaware authorized the building of the dam on the Blackbird Creek through a law which was passed under the police power of the state in order to clean up a health hazard and there was no legislation by Congress dealing with the same subject matter. Willson claimed that the law authorizing the building of the dam was a violation of the commerce clause. He believed he had a constitutional right to navigating coastal streams and Delaware's actions were motivated by private profits.

Opinion 
Chief Justice John Marshall affirmed the lower court's decision, that because no federal law dealt specifically with the situation, and the state law did not violate Congress' Dormant Commerce Clause power, the state law was valid. He did note, however, that the dam might interfere with interstate commerce.

See also
 List of United States Supreme Court cases, volume 27

References

Bibliography
 Jean Edward Smith, John Marshall: Definer Of A Nation, New York: Henry Holt & Company, 1996.
Gillman, Howard, Graber, Mark, and Keith Whittington, American Constitutionalism, New York: Oxford University Press, 2013.

External links

 

1829 in United States case law
United States Constitution Article One case law
United States Supreme Court cases
United States Supreme Court cases of the Marshall Court
United States Dormant Commerce Clause case law
Legal history of Delaware
1829 in Delaware
Transportation in New Castle County, Delaware
Maritime history of Delaware
United States admiralty case law